Blood Wars can refer to:
Underworld: Blood Wars
 Blood Wars (card game)
 Blood Wars (video game)

See also

 Blood War